Iliff School of Theology is a graduate Methodist theological school in Denver, Colorado.  Founded in 1892, the school's campus is adjacent to the University of Denver. Fewer than 200 students attend the school. 

Iliff is one of thirteen United Methodist Church seminaries in the United States. It also has close connections with the United Church of Christ, the Evangelical Lutheran Church in America, the Unitarian Universalist Association, the Episcopal Church, the Presbyterian Church USA, the Metropolitan Community Church, and others.  Iliff's student body represents more than thirty faith traditions, and Iliff aims to recruit, enroll, and retain a student body that is fifty percent Black, Indigenous, and Persons of Color (BIPOC) by the fall of 2024.

The school library, called the Ira J. Taylor Library, contains the largest theological collection in the Rocky Mountain area with approximately 205,800 volumes, 60,600 microforms, and over 900 current periodical and serial subscriptions.

Iliff School of Theology is accredited by Association of Theological Schools in the United States and Canada and the North Central Association of Colleges and Schools-Commission on Institutions of Higher Education.

History

Iliff was founded in 1889 as a seminary and school of religious studies of the University of Denver. In 1892, it was named the Iliff School of Theology after John Wesley Iliff (1831–1878) who had wanted to establish a school for training ministers in the territory of Colorado.  After he died, his wife Elizabeth Iliff Warren and her second husband, Bishop Henry White Warren, succeeded in starting the Iliff School of Theology.  The cornerstone of Iliff Hall was laid on June 8, 1892 and construction was completed in 1893.  While the construction was taking place, the first classes began on September 23, 1892.

In the summer of 1900, Iliff closed for various financial and organizational reasons. On August 27, 1903, Iliff School of Theology was incorporated as an independent institution, separate from the University of Denver. It reopened on September 10, 1910 as a freestanding school of theology and Methodist seminary.

"In 1893, Iliff School of Theology took into its library a book, given as a gift, written in Latin that is a History of Christianity.  It was covered by the skin of a murdered Indian man.  It was treasured by the institution and displayed for 80 years in a case outside of the Library.  In 1974, under pressure from students, the book was taken out of public view and in the presence of a representative of the American Indian Movement, the skin cover was removed and repatriated.  Everyone present that day were sworn to secrecy and required to sign non-disclosure agreements."

In September 1981, Iliff and the University of Denver inaugurated a joint Ph.D. program leading to the Doctor of Philosophy in Religious and Theological Studies.

Iliff has hosted a number of high-profile leaders for special events, including former Secretary of State Madeleine Albright, the Little Rock Nine, and others.  From February 24–27, 2008, Iliff honored the Little Rock Nine in a series of events called "A Celebration of Courage."

In 2011, Iliff established "The Courage Award." The award is given out as a means "to acknowledge and celebrate individuals or organizations whose courage, persistence, and determination has changed an unjust situation in the world." The first recipient of this award was Judy Shepard for her work in telling the story of her son, Matthew Shepard.

Presidents
Presidents of the Iliff School of Theology have included:
1910–1915 Harris Franklin Rall
1916–1920 James Albert Beebe
1921–1924 Edwin Wesley Dunlavy
1925–1932 Elmer Guy Cutshall
1934–1942 Charles Edwin Schofield
1942–1946 Harry T. Morris
1947–1952 Edward Randolph Bartlett
1953–1961 Harold Ford Carr
1962–1969 Lowell Benjamin Swan
1969–1981 Smith Jameson Jones, Jr.
1981–2000 Donald E. Messer
2000–2004 David Maldonado, Jr.
2004–2006 J. Philip Wogaman
2006–2012 David G. Trickett
2012–2013 Albert Hernandez
2013–2023 Thomas V. Wolfe

Notable people

Alumni
Daniel A. Arnold, Professor of the Philosophy of Religion at the Divinity School of the University of Chicago.
Nadia Bolz-Weber, Founder and Pastor of House for All Sinners and Saints in Denver, Colorado
Terrance Carroll, Speaker, Colorado House of Representatives.
Rodger McDaniel, former member of the Wyoming House of Representatives and Wyoming Senate
Otis Moss III, Pastor of Chicago's Trinity United Church of Christ.
Andrew S. Park, Korean American Methodist theologian who teaches at United Theological Seminary in Trotwood, Ohio.
Mary Ann Swenson, American bishop of the United Methodist Church, elected in 1992.
Carol Voisin, member of the faculty at Southern Oregon University
Carrie Ann Lucas, lawyer, disability rights advocate, and activist
Brandan Robertson, writer, activist, and minister.

Faculty
Miguel A. De La Torre, Professor of Social Ethics
George Tinker, Clifford Baldridge Professor of American Indian Cultures and Religious Traditions

Former faculty
Wallace Clift, Head of Anglican Studies, 1992–2002
Vincent Harding, Professor Emeritus of Religion and Social Transformation, 1981–2004
Dennis MacDonald, Theology and Biblical Studies, 1980-1998.
Donald E. Messer, Henry White Warren Professor of Practical Theology, 1981–2000

References

External links
 

Universities and colleges in Denver
United Methodist seminaries
Seminaries and theological colleges in Colorado
Universities and colleges affiliated with the United Methodist Church
Educational institutions established in 1892
1892 establishments in Colorado